Reamonn Live is a live album by the German band Reamonn. It is Reamonn's final overall release, as the band entered a hiatus in 2012. It was released on 20 November 2009.

CD

Track listing
 "Faith" - 4:11
 "Set Of Keys" - 4:36
 "Through The Eyes Of A Child" - 4:06
 "Aeroplane" - 3:58
 "Broken Stone" - 4:26
 "Tonight" - 5:33
 "Open Skies" - 4:36
 "Free Like A Bird" - 4:50
 "Million Miles" - 3:56
 "Moments Like This" - 3:59
 "Serpentine" - 7:15
 "It's Over Now" - 5:59
 "Serenade Me" - 6:10
 "Goodbyes" - 4:17
 "The Island" (Bonus Track) - 5:50

DVD
Behind Closed Doors (On The Road To Reamonn)

Track listing
 "Road To Reamonn" - 22:03
 "From Burbank To Downtown - 8:05
 "The Million Miles Tour" - 23:26
 "From Ring To Park" - 4:16
 "Out Of Order" - 5:33

Personnel

Rea Garvey - vocals, guitar
Uwe Bossert - guitar
Sebastian Padotzke - keyboard
Mike "Gomezz" Gommeringer - beats
Phillip Rauenbusch - bass

References

Reamonn albums
2009 live albums
2009 video albums
Live video albums